James Hudson may refer to:

James Hudson (American football) (born 1999), American football player
Sir James Hudson (diplomat) (1810–1885), British diplomat
James Hudson (explorer) (1854–1912), New Zealand doctor and explorer
James Hudson (gardener) (1846–1932), English gardener who won the Victoria Medal of Honour
James Hudson (rugby union) (born 1981), English rugby union player
James Hudson (politician) (1881–1962), British Member of Parliament
James H. Hudson (1877–1947), American judge in Maine
Jim Hudson (1943–2013), American football player
Jim Hudson, character in the TV series Revolution
Jimmy Hudson, Marvel Comics character
James Thompson (martyr) (died 1582), Catholic martyr also known as James Hudson
Guardian (Marvel Comics), aka James MacDonald Hudson, a Marvel Comics superhero